Cristian Radu Silvășan (born 25 February 1982) is a Romanian former football player. He played as striker, but he could also be used as a right midfielder.

Career 
At the beginning of his career, Silvășan swapped twice between Bucharest and Craiova (Fulgerul Bragadiru – Electroputere Craiova – Rocar București – Universitatea Craiova), before moving to FCU Politehnica Timişoara. He showed a lot of promise in the first two seasons at Poli, despite scoring only 13 goals in 56 matches. However, he did not really rise up to the expectations of the public, thus, he ended up spending more time on the bench than on the field. In the winter of 2007 he was released from the club and joined Politehnica Iaşi. In 2007 Silvășan was transferred to U Cluj, in August 2008 moved to Gloria Bistrita.

External links
 
 

1982 births
Living people
People from Câmpia Turzii
Romanian footballers
Association football forwards
Liga I players
Liga II players
AFC Rocar București players
FC U Craiova 1948 players
FC Politehnica Timișoara players
FC Politehnica Iași (1945) players
FC Universitatea Cluj players
ACF Gloria Bistrița players
CS Gaz Metan Mediaș players
FC UTA Arad players
FCV Farul Constanța players